Vice Chief of the Army Staff may refer to:

Vice Chief of the Army Staff (India), the second highest ranking army officer
Vice Chief of Army Staff (Pakistan), the second-in-command of the army

See also
 Vice Chief of Staff of the United States Army, the second highest ranking army officer
 Deputy Chief of Army (Australia), the second most senior army officer
 Deputy Chief of the Army Staff (India), formerly second highest ranking officer, now third highest in command chain each one a head of a branch of the army